Lou Graham (born 1938) is an American golfer.

Lou Graham may also refer to:

Lou Graham (Seattle madame), 19th century Seattle brothel owner
Lou Gramm (born 1950), American singer-songwriter

See also
Louis E. Graham (1880–1965), American politician